New Mills Newtown railway station serves the Peak District town of New Mills in Derbyshire, England. It also serves as an interchange with the Hope Valley Line station New Mills Central, 15 minutes' walk away across the valley.

It was built in 1857 on the Stockport, Disley and Whaley Bridge Railway line, which in 1863 was extended by the London and North Western Railway to connect with the Cromford and High Peak Railway and run to Buxton.

History
In the past, New Mills Newtown had quite a substantial goods yard, including an elevated signal box of LNWR type 5/6 design, a large three-storey warehouse including basement, and a crane and wharf. These were all built by the LNWR. Recently, the last remaining evidence of this goods yard was demolished. These were the stables for what were meant to be the railway's horses, but ended up being used for many other horses in New Mills. There is also a three-span wrought-iron footbridge that connects Redmoor to its other half, the end of which has steps leading down to the children's park on Chapel Street. This is built on five brick columns: there are five columns for a three-span bridge because one end is held by the steps, the other supported by the Chalkers Snooker Club embankment. The others are in close alignment holding an otherwise flimsy thin iron bridge.

Facilities
The station has retained a booking office (on platform 1), which is normally staffed from 06:40 to 13:10 on weekdays only. There are also two ticket machines on both platforms. 

There are stone waiting shelters on both platforms, train running information on CIS boards, and announcements. Step-free access is available to both platforms, which are also linked by the pedestrian footbridge.

Services

There are two trains per hour Monday - Saturday to Manchester Piccadilly northbound and to Buxton southbound throughout most of the day. One train each weekday continues through to Manchester Victoria. Trains run every hour each way on Sundays.

References

External links

Railway stations in Derbyshire
DfT Category E stations
Former London and North Western Railway stations
Railway stations in Great Britain opened in 1857
Northern franchise railway stations
New Mills